Benjamin Miles "C-Note" Franklin, played by Rockmond Dunbar, is a fictional character from the American television series, Prison Break. The character was introduced as a prisoner in the pilot episode. The actor was promoted from a recurring guest star to a regular cast member midway through the first season.

Background
Franklin was a First Sergeant in the U.S. Army, stationed in Iraq. While serving as a guard for a detention facility, he uncovered a shocking practice (illegally torturing several detainees) and reported it to his commander. C-Note's commander dishonorably discharged him for his involvement in black-market activities after C-Note refused to agree to keep quiet about the incident. With the shame of dishonorable discharge hanging over him, C-Note had great difficulty finding other jobs to support his wife Kacee and daughter Dede, so he resorted to criminal means. His brother-in-law, Darius Morgan (Mike Jones) was a truck driver and suggested that he could help transport stolen goods. Eventually, C-Note was caught and because he would not give up the identities of his friends, he was sent to Fox River State Penitentiary. He told his wife and daughter that he was getting shipped back to Iraq (as he had not even told them of his discharge from the Army). He begged his brother-in-law not to let them know he was going to be imprisoned. Once inside Fox River, C-Note eventually starts working in the prison kitchen and gains a reputation as the "prison pharmacist", being able to acquire any item or substance for other inmates for $100, or a "C-Note" (which, in conjunction with his namesake's appearance on the bill, spawns his nickname).

Appearances
C-Note's first appearance in the series was in the pilot and was a recurring character in the first 2 episodes.  According to an interview with Rockmond Dunbar C-Note was only supposed to appear in these 2 episodes but when the show was picked up for a full season C-Note's role was extended to a recurring character after the thirteenth episode of the first season.

Season 1 
C-Note makes his first appearance in the pilot episode when Michael Scofield asks him to obtain some PUGNAc to allow Michael to feign diabetes and thus gain access to the infirmary (a critical aspect of his escape plan). C-Note is curious to know his motives, but Michael refuses to tell him. In "Allen", C-Note refuses to deal with Michael after seeing him associating with T-Bag, leader of a white supremacist group in the prison. He later reconsiders after seeing Michael apparently fighting one of T-Bag's men during a riot, though his curiosity is not diminished. C-Note is then absent for six episodes, but eventually returns to the show with a minor role in the episode "Tweener", where he becomes suspicious of the PI crew when he realizes that they are discarding pieces of concrete across the prison yard, from the hole they are digging in the break room. C-Note plays a bigger role in the next episode "Sleight of Hand." After the PI head, John Abruzzi is briefly replaced by Gus Fiorello, C-Note bribes him to work in PI. He quickly discovers the hole that Michael and his crew had dug as part of the escape plan. When Abruzzi regained control of PI, C-Note threatens the crew to let him on board or he would tell the guards. The others reluctantly agree. He is initially a source of friction on the team, often questioning other characters’ actions, and in the episode "Odd Man Out" he attempts to conspire against Michael by turning his cellmate, Fernando Sucre, against him.

C-Note is one of six inmates involved in the first failed escape attempt in "End of the Tunnel." In the same episode, it is revealed that the character has a wife and daughter on the outside, whom he has tricked into thinking that he is serving in the military overseas. When Abruzzi is temporarily written out of the show, C-Note replaces him as a main character from episode 14 and onwards. He later becomes a respected member of the team in the season's later episodes, helping the team out of several problems that nearly derails the escape plan. He also befriends fellow escapee Charles Westmoreland as they both share the same need to see their family again. One consequence of his joining the escape team, however, is C-Note being ostracized by other black inmates for the same reason C-Note had initially refused to deal with Michael: consorting with T-Bag, who had also joined the escape team. This becomes a plot point in "Bluff", and the subplot continues through the next few episodes. C-Note has two violent encounters with his former associates and Trumpets, the leader of one of the black gangs, issues a death mark on his head in the episode "Go." Only the escape prevents him from being killed. After the "Fox River Eight's" escape from the prison, C-Note, Michael, Lincoln, Sucre and Abruzzi meet bigger problems as their escape plane takes off and leaves them stranded with numerous police on their trail, forcing them to run into the woods in a desperate attempt to evade their pursuers.

Season 2 

In the second season, C-Note's storyline alternates between his participation in the search for Westmoreland's money, as well as a separate subplot in which the character seeks to reunite with his family. After parting ways with the other escapees in "Otis", C-Note travels to Utah and eventually reunites with other members of the Fox River Eight in "Subdivision." In these episodes, C-Note returns to his earlier role as the one who instigates tension amongst the escape team, especially between him and T-Bag. The fugitives spend several episodes digging for the money and ultimately find it. However, C-Note and the others are apparently betrayed by Sucre, who double crosses them all and demands the money while holding them at gun point. Left empty-handed, C-Note returns to Chicago, where he attempts to re-unite with his family in "Unearthed."

Made aware of his fugitive status in the episode "Scan", his wife Kacee is very upset to learn the truth and is initially uncertain if she should stay loyal to her husband. However, she later decides to stand by him. In the episode "Unearthed", C-Note meets up with his old friends and asks them for help to escape with Kacee and Dede. They are narrowly able to avoid capture by federal agents, and C-Note is reunited with his wife and daughter at the end of the episode.

After being absent for 2 episodes, C-Note and his family resurfaces in North Dakota, in the episode "Disconnect", having a good time until his daughter complains of stomach problems as they have left her medicine behind. Kacee attempts to purchase more medication at a nearby pharmacy, but is identified by the clerk and taken into police custody. C-Note, horrified, can only watch in shock from his hiding place as his wife is arrested and taken away. In the season's later episodes, the character becomes increasingly desperate. In "John Doe", a guilt-ridden C-Note attempts to have his wife skip bail, only to learn that Kacee's bail is denied. The episodes "Chicago" and "Bad Blood" then focuses on C-Note trying to take care of his daughter. In "Bad Blood", he attempts to find medical care for the increasingly ill Dede. Meanwhile, FBI Special Agent Mahone has received a report that C-Note was spotted in Minnesota and arrives to pursue him. At the end of the episode, Dede's health rapidly deteriorates, and C-Note is forced to give himself up to save his daughter's life. He also makes a deal with Agent Mahone to release his wife in exchange for C-Note's co-operation with trying to find Michael Scofield. In his last scene of the episode, C-Note is being led away in handcuffs.

His last three episodes feature C-Note in custody and unsuccessfully trying to help Mahone to track down Michael. After Mahone no longer has need for C-Note, he is pressured by the nefarious Company to ensure C-Note's death. Mahone reluctantly urges C-Note to hang himself, threatening his family if he does not obey. The episode ends with a cliffhanger as C-Note attempts to hang himself in his cell. In the next episode, however, he is rescued by the guards. Mahone's subordinate, Agent Wheeler, then questions C-Note and promises him protection in exchange for his testimony against Mahone. In the episode "Panama", C-Note agrees to the deal put forward by Wheeler and Internal Affairs Agent Sullins. In return, C-Note is released from prison and placed in the Witness Protection Program with his family. In his last scene of the season, C-Note is seen walking away with his wife and daughter to start a new life. The actor retains his name in the opening credits for the last two episodes of season 2, but does not appear. "Panama" is his last appearance as a regular cast member. He is the first principal character to have been written out without being killed off from the series and the first member of the Fox River Eight to be set free by the authorities.

Season 4 
Rockmond Dunbar reprises his role in the last two episodes of Prison Break. After he tracks down Sucre, C-Note explains that he is on the run again due to Internal Affairs refusing to hold up their end of the deal and that he has been contacted by a mysterious man (Paul Kellerman) and asked to kill Michael and Lincoln to help The Company. In the series finale, C-Note and Sucre save the brothers from certain death and later receive full exoneration for their efforts. In the series epilogue, C-Note is revealed to have become a UPS deliveryman, matching his specialty in prison: to get his fellow inmates any random material.

Characteristics 
As one of the Fox River Eight escapees, C-Note's main specialty revolves around being able to smuggle any random material in and out of any given territory. Apparently, this was also notified by his commanding officer right before he was dishonorably discharged. He also has an observant side about him, as he is the only one whom Scofield reluctantly recruited for the escape to have figured out what Abruzzi's PI crew were conducting on the break room on his own. While he genuinely respects Scofield as the man who broke them out of jail, C-Note, like any other father, cares more for his family and going even as far as handing Michael out to Mahone in exchange for his family's safety as well as attempting a suicide. When Roy Geary smugly stole an object of sentimental value from Westmoreland (whom C-Note forced into handing over to keep the plan safe), his immediate expression was anger.

In season 5, it is revealed that Franklin is a Muslim.

Production details
C-Note reporting the abuse of prisoners of war in Kuwait was inspired by the Abu Ghraib scandal.

References

Fictional African-American people
Prison Break characters
Fictional drug dealers
Television characters introduced in 2005
Fictional gang members
Fictional murderers
Fictional prison escapees
Fictional military sergeants
Fictional United States Army non-commissioned officers
Islam in fiction
Fictional prisoners and detainees in the United States